R. Manimaran is an Indian politician and former Member of the Legislative Assembly of Tamil Nadu. In the 2011 elections, he won a seat in the 14th Tamil Nadu Legislative Assembly from the Poonamallee constituency, which is reserved for Scheduled Castes, as a candidate of the All India Anna Dravida Munnetra Kazhagam party.

The elections of 2016 resulted in his constituency being won by T. A. Elumalai.

References 

Living people
All India Anna Dravida Munnetra Kazhagam politicians
Tamil Nadu MLAs 2011–2016
Year of birth missing (living people)